The Bachelor's Thesis Award (also the Undergraduate Thesis Award, Undergraduate Dissertation Award, Undergraduate Thesis Prize, Bachelor's Dissertation Award, Bachelor's Degree Thesis Award or Outstanding Undergraduate Thesis Award), is an academic award granted annually by each university to the best dissertation, thesis or research work in Bachelor's Degree at university, for their excellence in research.

The award 
The Bachelor's Thesis Award aims to reward excellence in research and in the dissertation of the university student. It is awarded in any field of knowledge (science, technology, medicine, law, social sciences, ...).

The Bachelor's Thesis Award can be awarded by the university, by the faculty or by an academic entity outside the university (a foundation, a company, ...).

See also 

 Bachelor's Degree Extraordinary Award
 Valedictorian
 Class rank
 Dux
 Grade inflation
 Latin honors
 Honours

References 

Academic terminology
Academic honours
Qualifications
Education awards